"Soul Power" is a song by James Brown.

Soul Power may also refer to:

 Soul Power!, 1967 album by Richard Holmes
 Soul Power (album), 2014 album by Curtis Harding
 Soul Power (film), 2008 documentary film
 Soul Power, a superhero from the animated television series Static Shock
 Soul Power, an ability used by the Street Fighter character Rose

See also
 Power of Soul (disambiguation)